The 2019 season is the San Jose Earthquakes' 37th year of existence, their 22nd season in Major League Soccer and their 12th consecutive season in the top-flight of American soccer.

Club

Current roster

Exhibitions

Unless otherwise noted, all times in PST

Competitions

Major League Soccer

Standings

Match results

The Earthquakes announced their 2019 season schedule on January 7, 2019.

Va

Unless otherwise noted, all times in PDT

U.S. Open Cup

References

San Jose Earthquakes seasons
San Jose Earthquakes
San Jose Earthquakes
San Jose Earthquakes